Old Haydon Bridge is a footbridge across the River South Tyne providing access between the Northern and Southern sides of the village of Haydon Bridge, Northumberland, England.

History

The first bridge at Haydon Bridge was built in around 1309, but following the flood of 1771, it had to be rebuilt in 1776. Following structural surveys it ceased to be used by cars and converted to footbridge use only in 1970.

It is listed as a Grade II building by Historic England.

References

Bridges in Northumberland
Crossings of the River Tyne
Grade II listed bridges
Grade II listed buildings in Northumberland